Gangtoucunia is a genus of tube worm-like animals, known from the Cambrian aged Wulongqing Formation of Yunnan, China. While originally considered to be of uncertain affinites, specimens described in 2022 preserving the soft-tissue anatomy suggests that it was a cnidarian belonging to Medusozoa.

References 

Cambrian animals of Asia